Makhtesh Ramon (lit. Ramon Crater/Makhtesh ; ; lit. The Ruman Wadi) is a geological feature of Israel's Negev desert. Located some 85 km south of the city of Beersheba, the landform is the world's largest "erosion cirque" (steephead valley or box canyon). The formation is 40 km long, 2–10 km wide and 500 meters deep, and is shaped like an elongated heart. Despite its appearance it is not an impact crater from a meteor nor a volcanic crater formed by a volcanic eruption. 

The only settlement in the area is the small town of Mitzpe Ramon (מצפה רמון, "Ramon Lookout") located on the northern edge of the depression. Today the area forms Israel's largest national park, the Ramon Nature Reserve.

Formation

Hundreds of millions of years ago, the Negev desert was covered by an ocean. Slowly, this started to recede northwards leaving behind a hump-shaped hill. The hump was slowly flattened by water and climatic forces. Approximately five million years ago, the Arava Rift Valley was formed, with rivers changing their courses, carving out the inside of the crater which was a softer rock than that overlying. The crater bottom continued to deepen at a much faster rate than the surrounding walls, which gradually increased in height. As the crater deepened, more layers of ancient rock were exposed with rocks at the bottom of the crater being up to 200 million years old. Today, the crater is 500 metres deep with the deepest point being  (Saharonim Spring) which also contains the makhtesh's only natural water source, which sustains much of the wildlife in the makhtesh including onagers and ibex.

Geology

Makhtesh Ramon contains a diversity of rocks including clay hills known for their fantastic red and yellow colors and forms. Impressive mountains rise at the borders of the crater - Har Ramon (Mt. Ramon) at the southern end,  (Mt. Ardon) at the north-eastern end, and two table mountains - Har Marpek (Mt. Marpek - "Elbow"), and Har Katum (Mt. Katum - "Cropped") along the southern wall. The hills to the north-eastern edge of the makhtesh were once entirely covered by spiral ammonite fossils, ranging from the size of snails to that of tractor wheels although these have mainly been extracted so only smaller fossils can be found here today.

Giv'at Ga'ash, a black hill in the north of the makhtesh was once an active volcano which erupted thousands of years ago and caused it to be covered in lava which quickly cooled in the open air, converting it into basalt. Limestone covered by basalt can also be found in smaller black hills in the southern part of the makhtesh, including Karnei Ramon.

Shen Ramon (Ramon's Tooth) is a rock made of magma which hardened whilst underground. It later rose up through cracks in the Earth's surface, and today stands in striking contrast with the nearby creamy coloured southern wall of the crater, as a black sharp-edged rock.

In the centre of the makhtesh is HaMinsara (The Carpentry Shop), a low hill made up of columnar jointed sandstone - polygonal prismatic columns of quartzite.

The pteriidan bivalve Family Ramonalinidae is found in early Middle Triassic rocks of Makhtesh Ramon and was named after this feature.

Nahal Ardon in the east of the makhtesh contains several vertical dikes. Occasional geodes of celestine can be found next to some of them.

Fauna 

The Asian wild ass has been reintroduced to Makhtesh Ramon. In 1995 the population had increased to 40 adults in the area. The animals are hybrids of two different subspecies of the Asian Wild Ass. It is derived from the Turkmenian kulan (E. h. kulan) and the Persian onager (E. h. onager). The original subspecies, the Syrian wild ass (E. h. hemippus), is completely extinct. Other larger mammals of the area include Nubian ibex, Dorcas gazelles, striped hyenas and few Arabian leopards.

History

These ruins acted as a way station for the traders and their animals (khan is the Arabic word for a caravanserai) as they proceeded further westwards to the Mediterranean seaport city of Gaza.

Gallery

References

External links

 Ramon Crater on Google Maps
 Ramon Crater Detailed trail and hiking info. from Tourism, trips and travel in Israel
Makhtesh Ramon's Visitors Center, at the Israel Nature and Parks Authority's website.
Mazor, Emanuel and Krasnov, Boris, editors "The Makhteshim Country - a Laboratory of Nature". Pensoft Publishers, Sofia, 2001, 411 pages

Erosion landforms
Landforms of Israel
National parks of Israel
Protected areas of Southern District (Israel)